The 1975 World Football League season was the second and last season of the World Football League. The 1975 season was to be an 18-game season over a twenty-week schedule.

The WFL returned with a massive overhaul under new commissioner, Christopher Hemmeter. Four of the inaugural twelve teams returned from the 1974 season: The Hawaiians, Southern California Sun, Philadelphia Bell and Memphis Southmen, as did the Shreveport Steamer and Charlotte Hornets, who moved from Houston and New York City, respectively, midway through the 1974 season. New WFL teams replaced folded teams in Birmingham (where the Vulcans replaced the league champion Americans), Portland (where the Thunder took the place of the Storm), Jacksonville (the Express took over for the Sharks), and Chicago (the Winds stepped into the place of the Fire). One new market was added when the Florida Blazers moved to become the San Antonio Wings; the Blazers and Detroit Wheels were not replaced in their home markets.

The Winds were expelled from the league five games into the season.  They had essentially bet their existence on an attempt to woo New York Jets quarterback Joe Namath as its starting quarterback. The Winds all but promised that Namath was coming, and their failure to deliver him was a severe blow to the league's credibility.  It also prompted TVS Television Network, the league's TV partner, to cancel its WFL coverage prior to the regular season, leaving the league untelevised with the exception of some local television.

Memphis and San Antonio won the first half of the split-season format and had secured playoff spots for the end of the season. The playoffs were to have six teams and World Bowl 2 was scheduled for Sunday, January 4, 1976. Without significant television and low attendance, WFL ceased operations twelve weeks into the regular season on Wednesday, October 22. The Birmingham Vulcans had the league's best record (9–3) at the time of the shutdown.

Draft
Because of the uncertainties facing the WFL, the 1974 WFL Draft was the only collegiate draft held by the league. In 1975, only a Pro Draft of entire NFL and CFL teams was done at its league meetings in Birmingham, Alabama. The professional football teams chosen were the following:

 Birmingham Vulcans: Atlanta Falcons, Kansas City Chiefs, and Winnipeg Blue Bombers.
 Charlotte Hornets: Baltimore Colts, Detroit Lions, and Buffalo Bills.
 Chicago Winds: Pittsburgh Steelers, New York Jets, and Edmonton Eskimos.
 The Hawaiians: San Francisco 49ers, Denver Broncos, and Philadelphia Eagles.
 Jacksonville Express: Miami Dolphins, Cleveland Browns, and Green Bay Packers.
 Memphis Southmen: Toronto Argonauts, St. Louis Cardinals, and New England Patriots.
 Philadelphia Bell: Montreal Alouettes, New York Giants, and Washington Redskins.
 Portland Thunder: Oakland Raiders, Minnesota Vikings, Ottawa Rough Riders, and Saskatchewan Roughriders.
 San Antonio Wings: Dallas Cowboys, Houston Oilers, Calgary Stampeders, and Hamilton Tiger-Cats.
 Shreveport Steamer: New Orleans Saints, Chicago Bears, and Cincinnati Bengals.
 Southern California Sun: Los Angeles Rams, BC Lions, and San Diego Chargers.

Final standings

W = Wins, L = Losses, T = Ties, PCT= Winning Percentage, PF = Points For, PA = Points Against

See also
 1974 World Football League season

References

World Football League
World Football League